Thomas Franklin Schneider (born 1859 in Washington, D.C. — d. 1938) was an American architect who designed about 2,000 houses in the capital city area.

Among his important buildings are the Cairo Apartment Building, The Forest Inn, the Rochambeau, the Stoneleigh Court, the Ethelhurst, and his own private home, the Schneider House.

Schneider's parents were printers who moved from Germany to Washington, D.C., in 1830. After high school, Schneider worked for the architectural firm of Adolf Cluss and Schultze. While there, he worked on the construction of the Arts and Industries Building. He opened his own firm at age 24 and by 30 had designed The Cairo and The Forest Inn.

Schneider also created the city's first bus company.

Buildings by Schneider

References

1859 births
1938 deaths
19th-century American architects
Architects from Washington, D.C.